Marbeck is a surname. Notable people with the surname include:

 John Marbeck (1510–1585), English theologian and musician
 Roger Marbeck (1536–1605), English scholar, son of John
 Sarah Marbeck (born  1975), Malaysian-born Australian model

See also
 Marbeck (Itter), river in Germany